Synodality (from synod which is Greek συν ["together"] + ὁδός ["way", "journey"]) is in the Catholic Church a term "often used to describe the process of fraternal collaboration and discernment that bodies like the [Synod of Bishops] were created to express".

Meaning 
Synodality denotes the particular style that qualifies the life and mission of the Church. The Holy See's International Theological Commission states that synodality, when it concerns the Catholic Church, designates "the specific modus vivendi et operandi of the Church, the People of God, which reveals and gives substance to her being as communion when all her members journey together, gather in assembly and take an active part in her evangelising mission". Synodality also "refers to the involvement and participation of the whole People of God in the life and mission of the Church". The church's Dicastery for Promoting Christian Unity notes that the term synodality "[b]roadly [...] refers to the active participation of all the faithful in the life and mission of the Church".

Contemporary usage
Synodality is seen as one of the key words that characterizes the pontificate of Pope Francis. 

A document by the International Theological Commission discussing synodality was published in March 2018.

Synodality became the theme of the Synod on synodality (started in Rome in October 2021).

See also 

 Collegiality in the Catholic Church
 Synod of Bishops in the Catholic Church
 Conciliarity
 Sensus fidelium

References

Further reading 

 

 
 

Catholic theology and doctrine
Christian terminology